The Million is a 1914 American comedy silent film directed by Thomas N. Heffron and written by Georges Berr, Marcel Guillemaud and Eve Unsell. The film stars Edward Abeles, Robert Stowe Gill, Ruby Hoffman, Edna Mayo and John Daly Murphy. The film was released on December 31, 1914, by Paramount Pictures.

Plot

Cast 
Edward Abeles as Le Baron
Robert Stowe Gill
Ruby Hoffman	
Edna Mayo 		
John Daly Murphy
William Roselle

References

External links 
 

1914 films
1910s English-language films
Silent American comedy films
1914 comedy films
Paramount Pictures films
American black-and-white films
Films directed by Thomas N. Heffron
American silent feature films
1910s American films